First Congregational Church is a historic church at 30 Hillside Road in Chester Borough, New Jersey. It was founded in 1740. 

The Greek Revival church was built in 1856. It is the third building used by the congregation, the first was built 1747, and the second in 1803. The church was added to the National Register of Historic Places on August 10, 1977, for its significance in architecture, art, and religion.

Social Action 
The church has fundraised for a variety of causes, including:

 Dayspring Ministries, a Christian organisation which supports a school, orphanage, food program and family health clinic in haiti
 Good News Home for Women, a drug and alcohol rehabilitation center for adult women
 Market Street Mission, which provides support to the "homeless, helpless, and hopeless"
 Carmen Ministries, who organise bible study sessions for incarcerated and ex-incarcerated men to help improve their lives and stop repeat offences
 Child Evangelism Fellowship, who provide opportunities to connect young people with God
 Free food to members of the local community
 Support for local people living in desperate poverty

Gallery

See also
National Register of Historic Places listings in Morris County, New Jersey
Nathan A. Cooper
Bergen County, New Jersey

References

External links

 
 

Chester Borough, New Jersey
Churches on the National Register of Historic Places in New Jersey
Greek Revival church buildings in New Jersey
Churches completed in 1856
19th-century churches in the United States
Churches in Morris County, New Jersey
National Register of Historic Places in Morris County, New Jersey
New Jersey Register of Historic Places
Congregational churches in New Jersey
1856 establishments in New Jersey